Agnes of  Aquitaine (end of 1072 – 6 June 1097) was a daughter of William VIII, Duke of Aquitaine, and his third wife, Hildegarde of Burgundy.

In 1081, Agnes was betrothed to Peter I of Aragon and Navarre. In 1086, the couple married in Jaca; upon Peter's succession, Agnes became queen of Aragon and Navarre. By him, Agnes had two children, both of whom predeceased their father: Peter (died 1103) and Isabella (died 1104).

Agnes died in 1097, and her husband remarried to a woman named Bertha.

References

Sources

1097 deaths
Aragonese queen consorts
Navarrese royal consorts
Countesses of Ribagorza
People from Aquitaine
1072 births
11th-century Spanish women
11th-century people from the Kingdom of Aragon
11th-century French women
11th-century French people
11th-century people from the Kingdom of Pamplona